Joseph Synnott (22 September 1893 - 14 August 1952) was an Irish Gaelic footballer. His championship career at senior level with the Dublin county team spanned ten seasons from 1919 until 1928.

Synnott first played competitive football during a golden age for the O'Tooles club. In ten years from 1918 until 1928 he won nine county senior championship medals with the club.

Success at club level saw Synnott join the Dublin senior team and he made his debut during the 1919 championship. Over the course of the next decade he had much success and won three successive All-Ireland medals between 1921 and 1923. He also won five Leinster medals.

Synnott's brothers, John and Peter Synnott, also played with Dublin.

Honours
O'Tooles
Dublin Senior Football Championship (9): 1918, 1919, 1920, 1922, 1923, 1924, 1925, 1926, 1928

Dublin
All-Ireland Senior Football Championship (3): 1921, 1922, 1923
Leinster Senior Football Championship (5): 1920, 1921, 1922, 1923, 1924

References

1893 births
1952 deaths
Dublin inter-county Gaelic footballers
O'Tooles Gaelic footballers